Metronet may refer to:

Metronet (British infrastructure company), who maintained London Underground infrastructure between 2003 and 2008.
Metronet (Western Australia), government agency formed in 2017, responsible for managing extensions to Perth's transport network.
Metronet, the sixth largest fiber-optic provider in the United States, see Plusnet, A1 Hrvatska etc.